Modra is the surname of:

 Kerry Modra (born 1973), Australian Paralympic tandem cycling pilot, wife of Kieran
 Kieran Modra (1972–2019), Australian Paralympic swimmer and cyclist
 Rob Modra (born 1972), Australian darts player
 Tania Modra (born 1975), Australian Paralympic tandem cycling pilot
 Tony Modra (born 1969), Australian footballer